"Drop & Gimme 50" is the lead single by American rapper Mike Jones from his second album, The Voice. The song was produced by Mr. Collipark, and features Hurricane Chris.

Charts

References

External links

(posted by record label)

2007 singles
2007 songs
Mike Jones (rapper) songs
Hurricane Chris (rapper) songs
Songs written by Mr. Collipark
Songs written by Mike Jones (rapper)